Grzędy Górne  is a village in the administrative district of Gmina Czarny Bór, within Wałbrzych County, Lower Silesian Voivodeship, in south-western Poland. The village has a population of 170.

References

Villages in Wałbrzych County